is a Japanese footballer who plays for AC Nagano Parceiro.

Club statistics
Updated to end of 2018 season.

References

External links
Profile at Albirex Niigata

 Profile at Tochigi SC

1992 births
Living people
Association football people from Saitama Prefecture
Japanese footballers
J1 League players
J2 League players
J3 League players
Shonan Bellmare players
Tochigi SC players
Albirex Niigata players
AC Nagano Parceiro players
Association football defenders